3 Nuts in Search of a Bolt is a 1964 comedy film starring Mamie Van Doren and Tommy Noonan, who also directed and co-wrote the film.

Plot

An out of work Method actor is hired by a stripper, a male model, and a car salesman to listen to their problems and go see a psychiatrist on their behalf; the three "nuts" lack the funds to see the psychiatrist on their own, hence the request. The actor has to pretend that he alone has all the problems of the three who hired him. The psychiatrist is naturally intrigued and begins secretly recording her sessions with him.

Cast
Mamie Van Doren as Saxie Symbol
Tommy Noonan as himself
Ziva Rodann as Dr. Myrna Von
Paul Gilbert as Joe Lynch
John Cronin as Bruce Bernard
Howard Koch as Dr. Otis Salverson

Background
On the bonus material section of the film's DVD release, Mamie Van Doren said that this film was inspired by the success of the sex comedy Promises! Promises! which starred Jayne Mansfield and also Tommy Noonan. She said that she was approached to play the lead in Promises! Promises!, but turned it down. Once that film became a hit for Jayne Mansfield, Noonan wrote and directed this film, with Van Doren in mind for a lead role.

External links

1964 films
American comedy films
1964 comedy films
1960s English-language films
1960s American films